King George Hall may refer to:

King George Hall, Colombo, a theatre of the University of Colombo
King George Hall, Kolar Gold Fields, India, a town hall
King George's Hall, Blackburn, England

Architectural disambiguation pages